Melanostomias pauciradius, the three-ray dragonfish, is a species of barbeled dragonfish native to the Western Pacific. It has 18 to 20 anal soft rays, and 15 to 16 dorsal soft rays.

References 

Fish described in 1938